Tilden is an unincorporated community in Benson County, North Dakota, United States. Tilden was a station on the Minneapolis, St. Paul and Sault Ste. Marie Railroad, located one mile west of U.S. Route 281 and approximately six miles north of Minnewaukan.

References

Unincorporated communities in North Dakota
Populated places in Benson County, North Dakota